The Associates may refer to:

 The Associates (band), a Scottish band
 The Associates (American TV series), a 1979–1980 American sitcom television series
 The Associates (Canadian TV series), a 2001–2002 Canadian drama television series

See also
 Associates First Capital Corporation, an American lender acquired by Citigroup in 2000
 Associate (disambiguation)